Thomas B. Considine is a former state managed care and financial services commissioner.  He is chief executive officer of the National Conference of Insurance Legislators (NCOIL) and the founder and managing partner of Gravilaur Solutions, LLC, a strategic consulting firm.

Education 
Considine graduated from Marist High School in Bayonne, New Jersey, where in 2018 he was inducted into the Marist Hall of Fame, for Professional Achievement.

He received his J.D. cum laude from the Seton Hall University School of Law and his B.S. magna cum laude from the W. Paul Stillman School of Business Administration at Seton Hall University. Additionally, he served on the Seton Hall University Alumni Board of Directors. He received the Seton Hall University W. Paul Still School of Business Alumni Service Award in 2012.

Commissioner 

Governor Chris Christie nominated Considine to serve as Commissioner of the New Jersey Department of Banking and Insurance (DOBI) on January 15, 2010.

Considine repealed several out-dated or burdensome regulations, led DOBI through reaccreditation by the National Association of Insurance Commissioners (NAIC) and Conference of State Banking Supervisors (CSBS) and fought insurance fraud.

While commissioner, Considine held leadership positions with the NAIC, including on its national Executive Committee, and also serving as the vice-chairman and chairman of the NAIC's northeast zone. He also chaired the NAIC Reinsurance Task Force, leading it during adoption of the NAIC's reinsurance models.

Considine stepped down to return to the private sector as COO of Magnacare on February 10, 2012.

Professional career 

Considine served as the chief executive officer of Meadowlands Hospital Medical Center (MHMC).   Prior to this post he served as chief operating officer of Magnacare. Previous to this he served as Commissioner of the New Jersey Department of Banking and Insurance. Prior to being named Commissioner, Considine worked at MetLife, Inc. for nearly 17 years. He also served on a number of professional boards and financial services industry-related organizations.

NCOIL named Considine as its CEO effective January 1, 2016.

Following law school, Considine was a law clerk to Senior U.S. District Judge Clarkson Fisher of the U.S. District Court for the District of New Jersey.

References 

Living people
State cabinet secretaries of New Jersey
Seton Hall University alumni
Seton Hall University School of Law alumni
Year of birth missing (living people)